Bovenau is a village in the district of Rendsburg-Eckernförde, in the German state of Schleswig-Holstein.

History 
Bovenau was first mentioned in 1240 as Kirchdorf. The name is derived from the Low German „boven de Au“, which means something like "above the creek". Several megalithic tombs have been found in the area of the settlement. Estates are located in the surrounding area: Gut Dengelsberg, Gut Georgenthal, Gut Kluvensiek, Gut Osterrade, Gut Steinwehr.

Buildings
The Maria Magdalena Church and the lock of the old Eider Canal in Kluvensiek are worth seeing.

Sons and daughters of the village
 The lawyer Benedikt Heins was born in 1710 in Bovenau, he died in Hamburg in 1774.

Bibliography
Chronik Bovenau, 2007

References

External links 
 

Rendsburg-Eckernförde